Siófok Kézilabda Club is a Hungarian women's team handball team from Siófok, that currently play in the Nemzeti Bajnokság I. They have competed in lower divisions until 2006, when they have won the third-tier championship and gained promotion to the Nemzeti Bajnokság I/B. That time a businessman, János Fodor took over the club, and with the support of the local government, he guaranteed the financial background to fulfil the club's long-term plans.

In May 2009, SKC received a surprise request from the Hungarian Handball Federation to replace the financially struggling Tajtavill-Nyíradony and join the top level championship. Siófok met all demands and unexpectedly started the 2009–10 season in the NB I. Despite being newcomers, the team performed well and finished in the respectable seventh position.

Crest, colours, supporters

Naming history
 –2008: Siófoki VSE
2008–2010: Siófok KC
2010–2015: Siófok KC-Galérius Fürdő
2015–2016: Siófok KTC KFT
2016–present: Siófok KC

Kit manufacturers and Shirt sponsor
The following table shows in detail Siófok KC kit manufacturers and shirt sponsors by year:

Kits

Sports Hall information

Name: – Kiss Szilárd Sportcsarnok
City: – Siófok
Capacity: – 1400
Address: – 8600 Siófok, Szekrényessy Kálmán utca 1.

Team

Current squad
Squad for the 2022–23 season

Goalkeepers
 1  Marina Rajčić
 12  Lili Herczeg
 77  Kincső Csapó
Wingers
RW
 2  Ana Kojić 
 23  Nelly Such
LW
 8  Tamara Mavsar
 55  Kíra Wald
 57   Szidónia Puhalák
Line players
 5  Szederke Sirián
 13  Lilly Török
 25  Hawa N'Diaye

Back players
LB 
 11  Dejana Milosavljević
 15  Kinga Debreczeni-Klivinyi
 24  Dounia Abdourahim
 44  Laura Lapos
CB
 10  Fanni Juhász
 14  Blanka Kajdon
 20  Rita Lakatos
RB
 28  Nikolett Papp

Transfers
Transfers for the 2023–24 season

 Joining

 Leaving
  Hawa N'Diaye (LP) (to  SCM Gloria Buzău)
  Marina Rajčić (GK) (to  CS Măgura Cisnădie)
  Lilly Török (LP) (to  MTK Budapest)
  Kinga Debreczeni-Klivinyi (LB) (to  Moyra-Budaörs Handball)

Staff members

 Head coach:  Uroš Bregar 
 Assistant coach:  Ziga Novak 
 Fitness coach:  Kornél Bubori
 Masseur:  Tamás Bimbó
 Rehabilitation coach:  Dóra Fábián
 Doctor:  Attila Kisegyházi, MD

 Chairman:  János Fodor
 Technical director:  Gábor Hargitai

Notable players

  Melinda Pastrovics
  Annamária Bogdanović
  Melinda Szikora
  Renáta Mörtel
  Csilla Mazák-Németh
  Zsuzsanna Tomori
  Ildikó Erdősi
  Viktória Lukács
  Bernadett Bódi
  Éva Kiss
  Luca Szekerczés
  Anita Herr
  Orsolya Herr
  Krisztina Triscsuk
  Babett Szalai
  Vivien Léránt
  Ivett Szepesi
  Szilvia Ábrahám
  Gabriella Tóth
  Júlia Hársfalvi
  Estelle Nze Minko 
  Camille Aoustin
  Gnonsiane Niombla
  Marie-Paule Gnabouyou
  Chloé Bulleux
  Nerea Pena
  Lara González Ortega
  Macarena Aguilar
  Mireya González
  Andrea Kobetić
  Katarina Ježić
  Andrea Seric
  Denisa Dedu
  Gabriela Perianu
  Melinda Geiger
  Teodora Bloj
  Daniela Piedade 
  Jaqueline Anastácio
  Silvia Pinheiro 
  Silje Solberg 
  Malin Holta
  Kjerstin Boge Solås
  Tatyana Khmyrova
  Irina Nikitina
  Danick Snelder
  Laura van der Heijden
  Sanja Damnjanović 
  Anđela Janjušević
  Jelena Agbaba
  Marija Agbaba
  Simone Böhme
  Camilla Maibom 
  Nina Müller
  Dinah Eckerle
  Michaela Hrbková
  Valentyna Salamakha
  Joanna Drabik
  Asma Elghaoui
  Simona Szarková
  Maja Vojnović

Coaches 

  József Varga (2009–2010)
  János Hajdu (2010)
  Vilmos Imre (2010–2012)
  Szilárd Kiss (2012–2013)
  Vladimir Golovin (2013–2015)
  Christian Dalmose (2015–2016)
  Roland Horváth (2016–2017)
  Lars Rasmussen (2017–2018)
  Tor Odvar Moen (2018–2020)
  Bent Dahl (2020)
  Zdravko Zovko (2020–2021)
 Gábor Danyi (2021)
 Uroš Bregar (2021–present)

Honours

Domestic competitions
Nemzeti Bajnokság I (National Championship of Hungary) 
 (2): 2011–12, 2018–19

Magyar Kupa (National Cup of Hungary)
 (1): 2013–14

European competitions
EHF European League
: 2018–19
: 2020–21

Recent seasons

Seasons in Nemzeti Bajnokság I: 14
Seasons in Nemzeti Bajnokság I/B: 2
Seasons in Nemzeti Bajnokság II:

In European competition
Siófok score listed first. As of 24 February 2023

Participations in EHF European League (EHF Cup): 6×
Participations in Cup Winners' Cup: 1×

Statistics: matches played: 53 – wins: 39 – draws: 5 – losses: 9 – goals scored: 1,612 – goals conceded: 1,349

References

External links 
  
 2019–20 Siófok KC season

 
Hungarian handball clubs